New Town Plaza is a shopping mall in the town centre of Sha Tin, Hong Kong. Developed by Sun Hung Kai Properties, it was the biggest shopping centre in the New Territories when it was completed in the early 1980s. Covering 200,000 square metres (49.4 acres), the plaza comprises Phase 1 (the main mall) and Phase 3, which are connected to each other, as well as the Grand Central Plaza, which is less than one kilometre from Phase 1. Phase 1 underwent extensive renovation from 2003 to 2008.

The nine-storey shopping centre is right next to Sha Tin station and Citylink Plaza. It is one of the busiest shopping malls in Hong Kong. There are many different transportation links to New Town Plaza, such as shuttle services from nearby estates, minibus routes, the MTR station located right within the plaza itself, and so forth.

Floor plan

Phase 1
LB: Play Park
UB: Play Park
Level 1: MOVIE TOWN Cinema, restaurants
Level 2: c!ty'super, Uniqlo, Beauty & Health Care
Level 3: Luxury & Beauty, Fashion, Cosmetics, agnès b., Bally, Coach, American Eagle, ZARA, Tommy Hilfiger, SaSa and a roof garden with Pet play area
Level 4: Fashion & Accessories, Apple Store, IT, G2000, H&M
Level 5: Trendy, Casual & Sports Wear and a roof garden
Level 6: Electric World (Fortess, DG Lifestyle, Broadway, Suning, AV Life) 
Level 7: THE MENU@Level 7, a CD shop and a roof garden in which a music fountain is included
Level 8: Maxim's Chinese Restaurant
Level 9: Roof garden

Phase 3

New Town Plaza Phase 3 is a private housing estate and a shopping arcade. It comprises 5 high-rise buildings and a 3-floor shopping arcade built between 1990 and 1991. Phase 3 underwent extensive renovation from 2017 to 2019, to increase the shops, the existing atrium from Level 1 to Level 2 have been removed.

Layout of the shopping arcade after renovation:
Level 1: Yata Department Store, Drop off area 
Level 2: Toys "R" Us, Commercial Press, MUJI ,Children's wear and various stores
Level 3: Decathlon, Foot Locker, GU, comesics store and restaurants

Layout of the shopping arcade before renovation:
Level 1: Toys "R" Us, Commercial Press, Children's wear and various stores, Drop off area 
Level 2: Yata Department Store
Level 3: Yata supermarket & food court, fashion store, comesics store and various stores

Grand Central Plaza

The Grand Central Plaza complex houses the HomeSquare shopping mall.
Levels 1 – 3: Furniture
Levels 5 & 6: IKEA flagship store in Hong Kong, in which a restaurant serving Swedish dishes is included

Snoopy's World
On the podium of Level 3 of Phase 1, there is an outdoor playground called the "Snoopy's World", the first Peanuts outdoor playground in Asia. It opened to the public on 1 September 2000.

Spots in Snoopy's World 
Doghouse Entry: the Snoopy House
 School Plaza: Peanuts Academy
 Boating Canal: Canoe Ride
 Baseball Playground: Peanuts Dugout
 Mini Town Area: Peanuts Boulevard
 Covered Sitting Pavilion: Party Pavilion

Musical fountain
When New Town Plaza Phase 1 opened, an oval musical fountain at the centre of Level 3 was an icon of the shopping mall and the largest musical fountain in Asia. It was demolished in August 2004 and then, in May 2005, rebuilt on the roof garden of Level 7, opening in November that year. But it was then closed in 2015 which is the year of New Town Plaza has opened 30 years.

Phase 1 gallery

Nearby shopping malls
New Town Plaza Phase 3
Grand Central Plaza
Citylink Plaza
Shatin Centre
Shatin Plaza
Lucky Plaza
Wai Wah Centre
Hilton Plaza

Nearby facilities

Sha Tin Town Hall
Sha Tin Public Library
Sha Tin Marriage Registry
Sha Tin Park
Royal Park Hotel, also developed by Sun Hung Kai Properties, and is regarded as Phase 2 of the New Town Plaza project. It has been designated as the Olympic Village in Hong Kong for the Beijing Olympics 2008.

During the Anti-ELAB movement in 2019

New Town Plaza is one of the key locations for the Anti-ELAB movement, which originated from a peaceful protest held on 14 July in Sha Tin escalated into intense confrontations between the protesters and the police when the protesters were kettled inside New Town Plaza. Sun Hung Kai Properties were scrutinised for allowing the police to enter the shopping centre without proper permit.

In September 2019, protesters gathered several times in different shopping malls to sing for the song Glory to Hong Kong. On 11 September 2019, around 1000 people sang the song in New Town Plaza together that night, with crowds of people singing the song in other shopping malls around Hong Kong as well.

References

External links

Note: Flash player required for the following links
Official website of New Town Plaza
List of shops in New Town Plaza
About Snoopy's World
HomeSquare website

Sha Tin
Shopping malls established in 1985
1985 establishments in Hong Kong
Sha Tin District
Shopping centres in Hong Kong
Sun Hung Kai Properties